Matthew "Kainawa" Ganda (born May 21, 1990), is a United Kingdom based recording artist, and record producer.

The artiste performs using his middle name "Kainawa" which means in his Mende language "The Big Man."

Although, Kainawa was born in Sierra Leone he has close ties to the African states of Guinee and The Gambia where he lived during his earlier years. He is especially proud of his Gambian ties, and proudly showcases his Wolof abilities whenever he can.

His debut single PACKAGE was released on 12 September 2016.

References

1990 births
Living people
Sierra Leonean emigrants to the United Kingdom
Sierra Leonean musicians